Phyllodesmium rudmani is a species of sea slug, an aeolid nudibranch, a marine gastropod mollusc in the family Facelinidae.

The specific name rudmani is in honor of malacologist William B. Rudman.

Distribution 
The distribution of Phyllodesmium rudmani includes North Sulawesi, Indonesia and Luzon, the Philippines.

Description 
The length of the slug is up to 45 mm. Its cerata are similar to (mimicry) closed polyps of soft coral of the genus Xenia.

Phyllodesmium rudmani contain endosymbiotic zooxanthellae of the genus Symbiodinium.

References

External links 

 http://slugsite.us/bow2007/nudwk546.htm
 http://slugsite.us/bow/nudiwk05.htm
 

Facelinidae
Gastropods described in 2006